Mrs Henderson Presents is a 2005 biographical musical film directed by Stephen Frears and written by Martin Sherman. It stars Judi Dench, Bob Hoskins, Kelly Reilly, and Will Young (in his acting debut). It tells the true story of Laura Henderson, an eccentric British socialite who opened the Windmill Theatre in London in 1931.

Mrs Henderson Presents was theatrically released on 25 November 2005 by The Weinstein Company. It received generally positive reviews from critics and did moderately well, grossing $27.8 million against its $20 million budget. It received two nominations at the 78th Academy Awards; Best Actress (for Dench) and Best Costume Design (for Sandy Powell).

Plot
Following her husband's death, eccentric 70-year-old widow Mrs Laura Henderson purchases a redundant cinema and remodels it to create the Windmill Theatre in London, as a post-widowhood hobby and appoints autocratic manager Vivian Van Damm. In 1937, they start a continuous variety revue called "Revudeville", but after other theatres copy this innovation, they begin losing money. Mrs Henderson suggests they add female nudity, similar to the Moulin Rouge in Paris, something unprecedented in the United Kingdom. The Lord Chamberlain (Rowland Baring, 2nd Earl of Cromer) reluctantly allows this under the condition that the nude female performers remain immobile, so the performances can be considered art, the equivalent of nude statues in museums.

Because the theatre's auditorium is below street level, it is relatively safe during the bombing of London, and performances continue. The performers bravely go on with the show even during frightening bombing raids, and the posed nude girls resume their poses, after ducking, as the whole theatre is shaken and the scene flats all round them sway when a bomb lands close by.

Maureen, one of the cast, becomes involved at Mrs Henderson's instigation with a young soldier, Paul, one of the audience regulars. Maureen becomes pregnant and receives word that after Paul is demobilised, he intends to return to his girlfriend. She becomes very upset, and hands in her notice. Before further developments, she is killed by a bomb while leaving the theatre.

Other scenes depict life in the theatre during the period. Mrs Henderson and Mr Van Damm frequently clash, but also show great appreciation for each other.

Eventually, the authorities want the theatre to close because of the danger from bombs to crowds gathering outside the theatre. Mrs Henderson successfully argues that for soldiers going to die in the war, this is their last chance, and for many of the young soldiers their only chance, to see naked women. She reflects on the death of her son in the First World War, and how he may never have even seen a naked woman except on a French postcard he had left at home, before going off to war and dying in a gas attack.

The film's closing credits explain that, on her death in 1944, Mrs Henderson bequeathed the theatre to Mr Van Damm.

Cast

Reception

Critical response
The film received mostly positive reviews. , the film holds a 67% approval rating at Rotten Tomatoes, based on 144 reviews with an average rating 6.65 out of 10. The site's consensus states: "Judi Dench and Bob Hoskins shine in this warm, witty period piece."  Metacritic assigned the film a weighted average score of 71 out of 100, based on 36 critics, indicating "generally favorable reviews".

The website Future Movies described the film as "very funny, sweet and charming". Roger Ebert reacted fairly positively to the film, saying "Mrs Henderson Presents is not great cinema, and neither was the Windmill great theater, but they both put on a good show."

Awards
The film won four minor awards and was nominated for 26, among them four BAFTA Awards including Best Original Screenplay, two Academy Awards, three Golden Globe Awards, and eight British Independent Film Awards.

Music

In other media

Musical

In June 2014, it was first revealed by producer John Reid that a musical adaption of the film was in the works, with a workshop taking place the same year.  On 16 October 2014, the musical was officially confirmed and it was announced that the show would receive its world premiere in summer 2015, with a view to a West End transfer. The musical is directed by and has a book by Terry Johnson, based on an original screenplay by Martin Sherman, with choreography by Andrew Wright, set design by Tim Shortall, costume design by Paul Wills, lighting by Ben Ormerod and magic consultancy by Scott Penrose. Music by George Fenton and Simon Chamberlain (musical director on the 2005 film) and lyrics by Don Black.

The show's premiere production began previews at the Theatre Royal in Bath, on 15 August 2015, with its official opening night coming on 26 August, for a limited run until 25 September 2015. Rehearsals began on 7 July 2015. On 6 March 2015, initial casting was announced with the news that Janie Dee would play the role of Laura Henderson with Emma Williams playing Maureen. Further notable casting included Ian Bartholomew as Vivian Van Damm and Mark Hadfield as Arthur. On 7 July 2015, it was revealed that Janie Dee had withdrawn from the production prior to rehearsals due to personal reasons and that Tracie Bennett would replace her in the role of Laura Henderson.

Following completion of the musical's tryout in Bath, it was announced that the show would transfer to the Noël Coward Theatre in London's West End with an official opening night of 16 February 2016 following previews from 9 February. The majority of the cast reprised their roles with the exceptions of Mark Hadfield, who was replaced in the role of Arthur by former EastEnders actor Jamie Foreman, Graham Hoadly  who was replaced (owing to a prior contractual commitment) in the role of Lord Cromer by Robert Hands and Jane Milligan who was replaced in the role of Lady Conway by Liz Ewing.

References

External links 

 
 
 
 
 

2005 films
2005 comedy-drama films
Battle of Britain films
BBC Film films
American biographical films
American comedy-drama films
British biographical films
British comedy-drama films
2000s English-language films
Films scored by George Fenton
Films directed by Stephen Frears
Films set in the 1930s
Films set in the 1940s
Films set in London
The Weinstein Company films
2000s British films